The 1995 Supercupa României was the second edition of Romania's season opener cup competition. The match was played in Bucharest at Stadionul Regie on 5 August 1995, and was contested between Divizia A title holders, Steaua București and Cupa României champions, Petrolul Ploieşti. The winner was Steaua București.

External links
Romania - List of Super Cup Finals, RSSSF.com

1995 in association football
Supercupa României
FC Steaua București matches